Zhang Lina (14 August 1940 – 17 October 2020) was a Chinese physical chemist. She graduated from Wuhan University in 1963. She was a Chinese polymer physical chemist, a professor at the School of Chemistry and Molecular Sciences of Wuhan University. In 2011, she became the first female Academician of the Chinese Academy of Sciences from Wuhan university. She was the editorial board member of Cellulose, Journal of Biobased Materials and Bioenergy and Acta Polymerica Sinica.

Scientific career 
Zhang Lina founded the Natural Polymer and Polymer Physics Research Group in 1993 and has been committed to fundamental and applied research of biomass resources and natural macromolecular material science. She solved the problem of the poorest soluble biomass macromolecule. The cellulose is a rich renewable resource on the earth, but the use of traditional manufacturing technology can harm the sustainable development of the environment. Zhang broke through the traditional method of polymer dissolution by heating and successfully dissolved cellulose and chitin using NaOH / urea solution at low temperature. Using Zhang's technology can reduce the generation of white pollution, and the materials generated using Zhang's technology can be completely degraded within a month. This technology makes the recycling of biomass wastes possible and renewable resources can be better utilized. Zhang pioneered new technology for low-temperature dissolution of polymers.

Achievements 
On March 27 2011, Zhang Lina won 2011 Anselme Payen award as a professor of Wuhan University and the first Chinese won this award.

Zhang has published 530 papers, authored 16 books, and been granted nearly 100 domestic and international patents. 

In 2006, Zhang wrote book Natural polymer modified materials and applications.

In 2007, Zhang wrote book Natural Polymer Science and Materials.

In 2011, Zhang wrote book Environmentally friendly materials based on biomass.

In 2015, Zhang wrote book Cellulose Science and Materials.

References

1940 births
2020 deaths
Chemists from Fujian
Chinese women chemists
Chinese physical chemists
Educators from Fujian
Members of the Chinese Academy of Sciences
People from Nanping
Physicists from Fujian
Wuhan University alumni
Academic staff of Wuhan University
20th-century chemists
20th-century Chinese scientists
20th-century women scientists
21st-century chemists
21st-century Chinese scientists
21st-century women scientists